Dakshinee is one of the music academies in Kolkata. It primarily focuses on teaching and promoting the Rabindrasangeet.

History
Suvo Guha Thakurta was a devotee of Rabindrasangeet. He wanted to spread it among Bengali masses which were then confined primarily to Santiniketan. On the advice of Shailaranjan Majumdar, he founded Dakshinee on 8 May 1948.

Early days
Dakshinee started with only 12 students. By 1955 it had 600 students. Between 1962 and 1972 the student strength was over 1500.

Sections
Since inception it has had four functioning sections:
Rabindrasangeet
Nrityakala Kendra (Dance School)
Drama
Cultural
Publication

Activities
Dakshinee organised Triennial Tagore Music Conference from 1951 - 1960 with the assistance of All India Radio.
Dakshinee celebrated the Tagore Centenary in 1961.

Publications
Rabindrasangeeter Dhara - Suvo Guha Thakurta wrote the book titled "Rabindrasangeeter Dhara" in 1950, about Tagore's compositions. In this book he classified Rabindrasangeet into 17 streams or ‘Parjyay’, as opposed to only 4 streams or 'Parjay' in 'Geetabitan'. This classification helps to understand Rabindrasangeet and the philosophy behind it by analysing the intertwined poetry, the legacy of Hindustani classical music as well as Rabindranath's original creations. This book is part of the academic curriculum of Dakshinee.
Subarno Joyonti Barsha (Shahitya Patra)
Rabindra Janma Satabarshiki
Rajat Joyonti Utsab

In 2008, Dakshinee proposed to publish a special edition on the occasion of its Diamond Jubilee Celebrations.

Location
This institute was earlier started at 132, Rashbehari Avenue. In 1955, it was moved to Dakshinee Bhawan, 1 Deshapriya Park (West) where it has remained.

Affiliated institutes
Nupur in London (Currently withdrawn)
Rabishikha in North London
Dakshinayan in South London
Robiprobash in Toronto
Kahlar in Washington DC (Currently withdrawn)
Uttarayan in New Delhi
Srijon in Mumbai

Notable teachers
Suchitra Mitra
Subinoy Roy
Sudeb Guha Thakurta
Kamala Basu
Sunil Kumar Roy
Subhas Choudhury
Ashoktaru Bandhapadhay
Rano Guha Thakurta

Prominent students
Ritu Guha
Rano Guha Thakurta
Saheb Chatterjee
Krishna Guha Thakurta
Srikanta Acharya
Debasish Roy Chowdhury
Prabuddha Raha
Shekhar Gupta
Shreya Guhathakurta
Kamalini Mukherji

Controversies
Although the institute professes to teach Rabindranath Tagore's ideals through his music, it has been alleged that Dakshinee believes in instilling a sense of fear among the rank and file of its students, an idea that is contrary to Tagore's own views on any kind of learning.

Dakshinee follows its own discrete notation, disregarding the notation accepted and printed by the bishwa-bharati.

See also
  Bengal Music College
  Calcutta School of Music
  Eastern fare music foundation

References

External links
Dakshinee's  official site
Gitabitan Live-2: a new CD brings Tagore to the public

Music schools in India
Bengali music
Universities and colleges in Kolkata
Educational institutions established in 1948
1948 establishments in West Bengal
Rabindranath Tagore